Abdul Aziz Abdullah Munshi is a lawyer and Attorney General of Pakistan for four terms.

Abdul Aziz Abdullah Munshi uses the shorter form Aziz A. Munshi and is a son of Mr. Abdullah Munshi who was a judge in Bombay, India and nephew of Prime Minister Ibrahim Ismail Chundrigar. Aziz A. Munshi started practising law in the year 1954 with his uncle I.I. Chundrigar in Karachi. Aziz A. Munshi has been practising law for over 60 years at his law firm, The Law Chambers of Aziz A. Munshi.

References

External links
 Aziz A Munshi phone tapped

 http://www.supremecourt.gov.pk/web/user_files/File/H.R.C.19of1996[AsgharKhanCase]DetailedReasons.pdf

Attorneys General of Pakistan
Lawyers from Karachi
Muhajir people
Year of birth missing (living people)
Living people